Vitali Yuryevich Ustinov (born 3 May 1991) is a Russian football player who plays as a right-back or left-back for Alashkert.

Club career
He made his debut in the Russian Second Division for FC Neftekhimik Nizhnekamsk on 24 April 2011 in a game against FC Volga Ulyanovsk.

On 3 June 2019, he left FC Rubin Kazan upon the expiration of his contract.

On 23 August 2019, he signed with the Kazakhstan Premier League club FC Atyrau.

On 14 January 2023, Alashkert announced the signing of Ustinov.

Career statistics

Club

References

External links

1991 births
Footballers from Moscow
Living people
Russian footballers
Russia youth international footballers
Russia under-21 international footballers
Association football defenders
FC Moscow players
FC Rubin Kazan players
FC Neftekhimik Nizhnekamsk players
FC Rotor Volgograd players
FC Rostov players
FC Atyrau players
FC Torpedo-BelAZ Zhodino players
FC Alashkert players
Russian Premier League players
Kazakhstan Premier League players
Russian expatriate footballers
Expatriate footballers in Kazakhstan
Expatriate footballers in Belarus
Expatriate footballers in Armenia